Syneta is a genus of leaf beetles in the subfamily Synetinae. There are about 11 described species in Syneta. The genus is entirely holarctic in distribution, with species appearing in North America, Siberia, East Asia and Northern Europe.

Nomenclature
The generic name "Syneta", derived from the Greek word meaning "sagacious", was first used by Eschscholtz in his collection, though he never published it. Syneta was then listed in the last two editions of Dejean's Catalogue of Coleoptera. No characters for the genus were mentioned in the Catalogue, though three species were listed; of these species, only one (Syneta betulae) was considered valid, the other two being nomina nuda, automatically making it the type species of the genus. Because of its inclusion in the Catalogue with a valid species, the name Syneta should be attributed to Dejean, though it has also been attributed to Lacordaire, who was the first to publish it with a description in 1845.

Species
 Syneta adamsi Baly, 1877
 Syneta albida LeConte, 1857 (western fruit beetle)
 Syneta betulae (Fabricius, 1792)
 Syneta betulae amurensis Pic, 1901
 Syneta betulae betulae (Fabricius, 1792)
 Syneta brevitibialis Kimoto, 1971
 Syneta carinata Mannerheim, 1843
 Syneta extorris Brown, 1940
 Syneta extorris borealis Brown, 1961
 Syneta extorris extorris Brown, 1940
 Syneta ferruginea (Germar, 1811) (rusty leaf beetle)
 Syneta hamata Horn, 1893
 Syneta pilosa Brown, 1940
 Syneta seriata LeConte, 1859
 Syneta simplex LeConte, 1857
 Syneta simplex simplex LeConte, 1857
 Syneta simplex subalpina Edwards, 1953

References

Further reading

 
 

Synetinae
Chrysomelidae genera
Taxa named by Pierre François Marie Auguste Dejean